Caleb Threlkeld (1676–1728)  was an Irish botanist, dissenting cleric and physician.

He wrote the first flora of Ireland under the title Synopsis Stirpium Hibernicarum .....Dispositarum sive Commentatio de Plantis Indigenis praesertim Dublinensibus instituta which was published in Dublin in 1726. An appendix was based on botanical notes made by Thomas Molyneux.

References

Nelson, E.C., Raven, M., 1998. Caleb Threlkeld’s family. Glasra 3: 161-166. 
Nelson, E.C.,1978 The Publication Date of the First Irish Flora. Caleb Threlkeld's Synopsis Stirpium Hibernicarum, 1726.' Glasra 2: 37-42. 

19th-century Irish botanists
1676 births
1728 deaths
19th-century Irish clergy